Haplochromis dentex is a species of cichlid endemic to Lake Victoria, but has not been seen since 1987. It may be extinct, but is maintained as Critically Endangered by the IUCN in the small chance that a tiny –but currently unknown– population survives.  This species grows to a length of  SL.

References

dentex
Fish described in 1922
Fish of Lake Victoria
Taxonomy articles created by Polbot